Rudolf Frank (19 August 192027 April 1944) was a German Luftwaffe military aviator during World War II, a night fighter ace credited with 45 enemy aircraft shot down in 183 combat missions. All of his victories were claimed over the Western Front in nocturnal Defense of the Reich missions against the Royal Air Force's Bomber Command.

Born in Karlsruhe-Grünwinkel, Frank volunteered for military service in the Luftwaffe of Nazi Germany in 1939 after finishing school. Following flight training, he was posted to Nachtjagdgeschwader 3 (NJG 3—3rd Night Fighter Wing) in 1941. He was awarded the Knight's Cross of the Iron Cross on 6 April 1944 following his 42nd aerial victory. Three weeks later, on 27 April 1944, he and his crew attacked an Avro Lancaster, which exploded and fatally damaged their own aircraft. Frank ordered his crew to bail out but was unable to save himself. He received posthumous promotion to Leutnant (second lieutenant) and was awarded the Knight's Cross of the Iron Cross with Oak Leaves.

Early life and career
Frank was born on 19 August 1920 in Karlsruhe-Grünwinkel in what was the Republic of Baden of the Weimar Republic; Grünwinkel is now a borough located in the southwest suburbs of Karlsruhe. Frank was the older of two sons of a shoemaker. He attended the Volksschule (elementary school) in Grünwinkel from 1926 to 1930, when he was enrolled in the Realgymnasium—a secondary school built on the mid-level Realschule—where he attained his Mittlere Reife (school leaving certificate) in 1939.

Even as a boy, Frank had wanted to become a pilot. World War II had begun on 1 September 1939 and he volunteered for military service in the Luftwaffe. Following his basic military training, he took flying instruction at the pilot school in Zeltweg. Here he qualified to fly the Bücker Bü 131, Bü 133 and Bü 181, the Klemm Kl 35, the Arado Ar 66, Ar 68 and Ar 96, the Focke-Wulf Fw 58, and the Junkers W 34 and Junkers Ju 52. In October 1940 he transferred to Nachtjagdschule 1 (1st Night Fighter School) at Schleißheim near Munich, formerly the Zerstörerschule 1 (ZS 1—1st Destroyer School). There he specialized as a night fighter pilot in the 2nd Squadron under the command of Staffelkapitän (squadron leader) Oberleutnant (First Lieutenant) Günther Specht.

World War II

World War II in Europe began on Friday 1 September 1939 when German forces invaded Poland. Following the 1939 aerial Battle of the Heligoland Bight, Royal Air Force (RAF) attacks shifted to the cover of darkness, initiating the Defence of the Reich campaign. By mid-1940, Generalmajor (Brigadier General) Josef Kammhuber had established a night air defense system dubbed the Kammhuber Line. It consisted of a series of control sectors equipped with radars and searchlights and an associated night fighter. Each sector named a Himmelbett (canopy bed) would direct the night fighter into visual range with target bombers. In 1941, the Luftwaffe started equipping night fighters with airborne radar such as the Lichtenstein radar. This airborne radar did not come into general use until early 1942.

Frank was posted to the 1. Ergänzungsstaffel (1st Supplemental Training Squadron) of Nachtjagdgeschwader 3 (NJG 3—3rd Night Fighter Wing) on 5 February 1941. The unit was stationed at Stuttgart-Echterdingen (now Stuttgart Airport). Initially he flew with radio operator (Bordfunker) Gefreiter (Private) Willimowski before Hans-Georg Schierholz was assigned as his permanent radio operator. Frank and Schierholz had already formed a crew at the Nachtjagdschule 1 at Schleißheim. The two were then assigned to 1. Staffel (1st Squadron) of NJG 3 stationed at Vechta. 1. Staffel was under the command of Staffelkapitän Oberleutnant Walter Milius. This unit was equipped with the C-variant of the Messerschmitt Bf 110 heavy fighter.  Both Frank and Schierholz were promoted to the rank of Gefreiter on 1 March 1941.

Night fighter pilot
Frank and Schierholz flew Bf 110 C-4 "L1+GH" on their first operational combat mission on 9 May 1941, without success. They flew their second mission on 12 May and another nine missions before claiming their first aerial victory during the night of 3/4 July. For this achievement, Frank and Schierholz were awarded the Iron Cross 2nd Class. On 15 July, they claimed their second victory, a Handley Page Halifax that they shot down at 01:05 northwest of Meppen. The victory was, however, credited to the anti-aircraft artillery. 

By 13 August 1941, Frank had flown 20 night fighter missions. For this achievement, he was awarded the Front Flying Clasp of the Luftwaffe for Night Fighters in Bronze and was promoted to Unteroffizier (sergeant). He was credited with his second victory on 15 September 1941, a Wellington shot down at 23:30 northwest of Meppen. This was also his last claim in 1941. He achieved his third victory, a Handley Page Hampden he shot down at 21:03 on 21 January 1942 near Berge in northeast Lingen. Five days later he claimed an Armstrong Whitworth Whitley Mk V, shot down at 20:36 west of Quakenbrück. 

Frank was awarded the Iron Cross 1st Class on 15 April 1942 and two months later, on 18 June 1942, the Front Flying Clasp of the Luftwaffe for Night Fighters in Silver. On 30 June 1942 at 01:29, he and Schierholz took off from Vechta on their 64th combat mission. While attacking a British bomber, either a Wellington or Halifax, their aircraft was hit by the defensive fire from the tail gun position at 02:40. With both radiators destroyed, they bailed out from their aircraft.

Frank's Gruppe (group) relocated to Rheine in Westphalia on 28 July 1942, when he flew further missions with Dornier Do 217 J "D5+G5", a night fighter variant of the Do 217. He claimed a Wellington shot down at 02:05 on 14 September 1942; it crashed in the vicinity of Osnabrück, and was his only victory while flying a Do 217. On this mission, the Dornier suffered engine problems and Frank made a forced landing at Bad Zwischenahn, damaging the aircraft. He ended the year 1942 with seven confirmed victories to his credit.

The first victory Frank claimed in 1943 occurred on 3 March. Again flying a Bf 110, he shot down a Short Stirling south of Delmenhorst. Contact with three other enemy bombers did not lead to any victories. Frank flew further missions in Do 217 "D5+LK" on a target practice mission on 9 April 1943. The right landing gear collapsed during the landing, causing 10% damage to the aircraft. Three days later he made an error during the landing approach, crashing Do 217 "D5+IK" and causing 30% damage. Frank avoided an official reprimand for either crash.

On 1 April 1943, Frank and Schierholz were transferred to the 2. Staffel of NJG 3, which was located at Wittmundhafen. Here they underwent conversion training to the Junkers Ju 88 C-6, which was designed for long-distance night fighter operations. While Frank was training, his old unit was relocated to Gilze-Rijen in the Netherlands. His unit also received the newer G-version of the Bf 110; these were equipped with SN-2 Lichtenstein radar. When Frank and Schierholz returned from conversion training, they were assigned Bf 110 G-4 "D5+CH" to fly as their personal aircraft. They claimed a Lancaster(ED810) near Antwerp on 15 June 1943. Two days later, on 17 June, they intercepted and shot down three more Lancasters from a force returning from a mission against Cologne. The three Lancasters came down within 41 minutes of each other over the Scheldt Estuary.

Frank claimed his 13th victory, a Wellington, on 22 June. While attempting another attack, both radiators were shot out and the crew was again forced to bail out. On 4 July they shot down a Halifax bomber north of Antwerp; this was his 14th victory overall. The unit relocated to Juvincourt, France, on 16 July 1943, Frank was awarded the Honor Goblet of the Luftwaffe on 9 August 1943. Now flying Ju 88 C-6 "D5+EK", again from Wittmundhafen, he claimed three aircraft shot down on 24 August 1944, but only received credit for the Short Stirling shot down at 00:47 over Berlin. Following his 110th operational mission, he was awarded the Front Flying Clasp of the Luftwaffe for Night Fighters in Gold on 18 August 1943.

Around this time in 1943, the two-man Bf 110 crew was augmented by a third member, sometimes referred to as Bordmechaniker (air mechanic) or Bordschütze (air gunner). On 31 August, Frank shot down two British bombers, a Halifax northwest of Venlo and a Lancaster east of Diepholz, during separate combat missions. On 2 September, his aircraft was hit in the right engine by enemy fire and he was forced to belly-land the Ju 88 "D5+DK" at Wilhelmshaven, suffering 20% damage to the aircraft. He claimed his 20th victory on the night of 23/24 September 1943. He added two more victories and on 17 October 1943 received the German Cross in Gold. The next day his aircraft was hit by German anti-aircraft artillery and Frank was forced to make a landing at Vechta on one engine. He was posted to the 3. Staffel on 14 December and ended the year with 26 aerial victories to his credit. A British intruder night-fighter shot Frank and his crew down over Berlin in a Junkers Ju 88 C-6, "D5+HP", on 24 December 1943, but they all managed to bail out unharmed.

Knight's Cross of the Iron Cross
Frank claimed his first victories of 1944, a Lancaster and a Wellington, on 21 January 1944 near Magdeburg. Having been promoted to Feldwebel (staff sergeant), Frank was assigned to the Stab (headquarters unit) of NJG 3, under the command of Geschwaderkommodore (Wing Commander) Oberstleutnant (Lieutenant Colonel) Helmut Lent. Frank's previous 6. Staffel had been transferred to Nachtjagdgeschwader 1 (NJG 1—1st Night Fighter Wing), where it continued operations under the designation of 12. Staffel.

On 20 February 1944, between 01:53 to 05:04, Frank became an "ace-in-a-day", shooting down five Lancaster bombers on their way to attack Leipzig. He was sent on a mission against intruding de Havilland Mosquito night-fighters on 7 March, but did not achieve any victories. He claimed his next victories on 22 March, a Lancaster shot down near Osnabrück and a Halifax near Gütersloh. On the same mission, while attacking a third bomber, his Messerschmitt Bf 110 "D5+BL" was damaged. An incendiary bomb, probably released by the bomber, penetrated the right wing and damaged the engine. Frank managed to bring the aircraft down at Gießen.

Three more bombers shot down on 25 March took Frank's total to 39 aerial victories. The Luftwaffe had its most successful night of the war on 30 March 1944. The entire night-fighter force was credited with the destruction of 132 enemy aircraft that night; Frank, who was credited with a further three bombers, brought his total to 42. For this achievement Oberfeldwebel (Senior Staff Sergeant) Frank was awarded the Knight's Cross of the Iron Cross on 6 April 1944. The presentation was made by Generalleutnant Joseph Schmid, commander of the I. Jagdkorps, at his headquarters in Braunschweig-Waggum on 10 April 1944. Frank then went on a short vacation at home with his wife Lisa, a Luftwaffenhelferin (female air force helper).

Following his vacation, Frank claimed two victories on 23 April 1944, a Halifax shot down at 02:11 north of Geldern and, later that day, a Short Stirling at 23:47 over Lolland. The Stirling was on a minelaying operation.

Death and posthumous honors

Frank was assigned Junkers Ju 88 (Werknummer 751 095—factory number) on 17 April 1944. He never flew this aircraft operationally. Ten days later, on the night of 26/27 April, he and his crew of radio operator Oberfeldwebel Schierholz and air mechanic Feldwebel Heinz Schneider took off in Messerschmitt Bf 110 G-4 "D5+CL" (Werknummer 720074) from Vechta. The mission was to intercept incoming bombers heading for the Ruhr Area.

The crew spotted and attacked an Avro Lancaster bomber over the vicinity of Eindhoven in the Netherlands. The bomber, severely hit by cannon fire at 01:58, exploded and became Frank's 45th and last aerial victory. Pilot Officer George Edwin Nicholls and his crew were killed. Debris from the Lancaster tore off the Messerschmitt's right wing and Frank lost control of the aircraft. He gave the order to bail out. Schierholz and Schneider parachuted to safety but Frank failed to get out in time.

Frank was buried at the German War Cemetery Ysselsteyn (Block Z—Row 6—Grave 149) at Venray. The funeral was attended by his parents, his crew Schierholz and Schneider, his Gruppenkommandeur Hauptmann Werner Husemann, the fighter operations leader for the Holland and Ruhr area Generalleutnant Walter Grabmann, and Generalmajor Ernst Exss, the airfield sector commander.

On 20 July 1944, Frank was posthumously awarded the Knight's Cross of the Iron Cross with Oak Leaves, the 531st soldier or officer of the Wehrmacht to receive this award. On 27 April Lent submitted a request to the I. Jagdkorps, recommending Frank for a promotion to Leutnant (second lieutenant). The commander of the 2nd Fighter Division Generalmajor Max Ibel as well as Schmid were supportive of the request. Frank was posthumously promoted Leutnant, backdated to 1 April 1944.

Summary of career

Aerial victory claims
According to Spick, Frank was credited with 45 aerial victories claimed in 183 combat missions. Aders and Obermaier also lists him with 45 aerial victories claimed in 183 combat missions. Mathews and Foreman, authors of Luftwaffe Aces — Biographies and Victory Claims, researched the German Federal Archives and found records for 43 aerial victories, plus two further unconfirmed claims. All of his aerial victories were claimed in nocturnal combat on the Western Front.

Victory claims were logged to a map-reference (PQ = Planquadrat), for example "PQ GR-2". These sectors were then subdivided into 36 smaller units to give a location area 3 × 4 km in size.

Awards and decorations
 Aviator badge
 Iron Cross (1939)
 2nd Class (4 July 1941)
 1st Class (15 April 1942)
 Honour Goblet of the Luftwaffe on 9 August 1943 as Unteroffizier and pilot
 Front Flying Clasp of the Luftwaffe
 in Silver (18 June 1942)
 in Gold (14 January 1944)
 German Cross in Gold on 17 October 1943 as Unteroffizier in the 2./Nachtjagdgeschwader 3
 Knight's Cross of the Iron Cross with Oak Leaves
 Knight's Cross on 6 April 1944 as Feldwebel and pilot in the 2./Nachtjagdgeschwader 3
 531st Oak Leaves on 20 July 1944 as Oberfeldwebel and pilot in the 2./Nachtjagdgeschwader 3

Notes

References

Citations

Bibliography

Further reading

 
 

1920 births
1944 deaths
Military personnel from Karlsruhe
German World War II flying aces
Luftwaffe personnel killed in World War II
Recipients of the Gold German Cross
Recipients of the Knight's Cross of the Iron Cross with Oak Leaves
Burials at Ysselsteyn German war cemetery
People from the Republic of Baden